Denderleeuw is a railway station in the town of Denderleeuw, East Flanders, Belgium. The station opened on 7 April 1855 and is located on lines 50, 89 and 90. The train services are operated by National Railway Company of Belgium (SNCB/NMBS).

Train services
The station is served by the following services:

Intercity services (IC-13) Kortrijk - Denderleeuw - Brussels - Schaarbeek (weekdays)
Intercity services (IC-20) Ghent - Aalst - Brussels - Hasselt - Tongeren (weekdays)
Intercity services (IC-20) Ghent - Aalst - Brussels - Dendermonde - Lokeren (weekends)
Intercity services (IC-23) Ostend - Bruges - Kortrijk - Zottegem - Brussels - Brussels Airport
Intercity services (IC-29) Ghent - Aalst - Brussels - Brussels Airport - Leuven - Landen (weekdays)
Intercity services (IC-29) De Panne - Ghent - Aalst - Brussels - Brussels Airport - Leuven - Landen (weekends)
Brussels RER services (S3) Zottegem - Denderleeuw - Brussels - Dendermonde (weekdays)
Brussels RER services (S3) Zottegem - Denderleeuw - Brussels - Schaarbeek (weekends)
Brussels RER services (S4) Aalst - Denderleeuw - Brussels-Luxembourg - Etterbeek - Vilvoorde - Mechelen (weekdays)
Brussels RER services (S6) Aalst - Denderleeuw - Geraardsbergen - Halle - Brussels - Schaarbeek (weekdays)
Brussels RER services (S6) Denderleeuw - Geraardsbergen - Halle - Brussels - Schaarbeek (weekends)
Brussels RER services (S10) Aalst - Denderleeuw - Brussels - Dendermonde

See also
 List of railway stations in Belgium

References

External links
 
Railway stations in Belgium
Railway stations opened in 1855
Railway stations in East Flanders
1855 establishments in Belgium